Calliandra humilis, the dwarf stickpea, is a species of flowering plants of the genus Calliandra in the family Fabaceae.

Uses
The Zuni people use the powdered root of this plant three times a day for rashes.

References

External links

humilis
Plants used in traditional Native American medicine